Dartmouth-Cole Harbour was a provincial electoral district in Nova Scotia, Canada, that elected one member of the Nova Scotia House of Assembly. It existed from 1993 to 2003.

Election results

1993 general election

1998 general election

1999 general election

References
Elections Nova Scotia - Summary Results from 1867 to 2011 (PDF)

Former provincial electoral districts of Nova Scotia